Riccarton Junction, in the county of Roxburghshire in the Scottish Borders, was a railway village and station. In its heyday it had 118 residents and its own school, post office and grocery store. The station was an interchange between the Border Counties Railway branch to Hexham and the North British Railway's (NBR's) Border Union Railway (also known as the Waverley Route).

History
The settlement of Riccarton, which adjoins the station, consisted, in 1959, of around thirty houses, with at least one member of each household working for British Railways, which had a civil engineer's depot near the station. Remarkably there was no road access until a forest track was built in 1963, all access until then being by rail. The isolated position of Riccarton and the need to provide for the villagers may have been one reason why the station remained open until the late 1960s, as by this time ordinary public traffic was virtually non-existent. The Waverley Route was closed on 6 January 1969. Part of it was re-opened in 2015 as the Borders Railway, but not as far south as Riccarton Junction.

Reuse (and Preservation)

Track panels were re-laid by the now wound-up Friends of Riccarton Junction, but these were later lifted in 2011.

The Waverley Route Heritage Association has since reconstructed a section of track between Whitrope Siding and Tunnel as a heritage railway; this is not connected to the site at Riccarton itself. The association, having secured a three-year lease on the two-mile section to the site, is aiming to restore this section of the former route from its base at Whitrope down the line into the Junction as the southern terminus of the preserved line.

In the media
Ian Nairn visited the station three years after its closing in his 1972 programme Nairn Across Britain: From Leeds into Scotland. By this date the tracks through the station had been lifted.

A 30-minute TV documentary, Slow Train to Riccarton, was produced in 1986. This included both archive film and contemporary footage. Most of the buildings in Riccarton village and station had disappeared, but the schoolhouse and stationmaster's house were still extant.

See also
List of places in the Scottish Borders

Notes

Citations

References

External links

Disused Stations: Riccarton Junction

Disused railway stations in the Scottish Borders
Railway stations in Great Britain opened in 1862
Railway stations in Great Britain closed in 1969
Former Border Union Railway stations
Former North British Railway stations
Beeching closures in Scotland
1862 establishments in Scotland